A number of steamships have been named Greenland, including
, a Canadian fishing and Sealing ship in service between 1872 and 1907
, a British cargo ship in service 1921–41
, a British cargo ship in service 1946–55

References

Ship names